The Kerala Legislative Assembly election of 1960 was the second assembly election in the Indian state of Kerala. The elections were held on 1 February 1960.

Background
In the 1957 elections in Kerala, the Communist Party of India formed the government with the support of five independents. But in 1959, the Central Government dismissed the democratically elected government through the controversial Article 356 of the Indian Constitution following "The Liberation Struggle", even though the elected communist government was enjoying majority support within the legislature. After a short period of the President's rule, fresh elections were called in 1960.

Constituencies
There were 114 legislative assembly constituencies in the Kerala Legislative Assembly, 1957. Out of these 102 were single-member constituencies while the number of double-member constituencies was 12. One constituency was reserved for Schedule Caste. There were 64,77,665 electors in single-member constituencies, while in double-member constituencies there were 15,63,333 electors. Total 312 candidates contested for the 126 seats of the 114 constituencies in the Assembly. Poll percentage was 85.72%, an increase of 20.23% from 65.49% in 1957 assembly elections.

Political parties
Four national parties, Communist Party of India, Indian National Congress, Praja Socialist Party and Bharatiya Jana Sangha along with the state party Muslim League took part in the assembly election. In these elections, the Indian National Congress, Praja Socialist Party, and Indian Union Muslim League formed a pre-poll alliance to counter the Communist Party of India. Together they fielded 125 candidates and supported an independent candidate, while the Communist Party of India fielded 108 candidates and gave party support to 16 independents.

Results

|- style="background-color:#E9E9E9; text-align:center;"
! class="unsortable" |
! Political Party !! Flag !! Seats  Contested !! Won !! Net Change  in seats !! % of  Seats
! Votes !! Vote % !! Change in vote % !! Vote % in  contested seats
|- 
| 
| style="text-align:left;" |Bharatiya Jana Sangh
| 
| 3 || 0 || New || 0 || 5,277 || 0.07 || New || 3.28
|-
| 
| style="text-align:left;" |Communist Party of India
| 
| 108 || 29 ||  31 || 23.02 || 3,171,732 || 39.14 ||  3.86 || 43.79

|- style="background: #90EE90;"
| 
| style="text-align:left;" |Indian National Congress
|  
| 80 || 63 ||  20 || 50.00 || 2,789,556 || 34.42 ||  3.43 || 45.37

|- style="background: #90EE90;"
| 
| style="text-align:left;" |Praja Socialist Party
|
| 33 || 20 ||  11 || 15.87 || 1,146,028 || 14.14 ||  3.38 || 38.41
|-
| 
|
| 12 || 11 || New || 8.73 || 401,925 || 4.96 || New || 47.79
|-
| 
|
| 61 || 5 ||  11 || 4.17 || 488,699 || 5.93 || -5.61 || 13.96
|- class="unsortable" style="background-color:#E9E9E9"
! colspan = 3|
! style="text-align:center;" |Total Seats !! 126 ( 0) !! style="text-align:center;" |Voters !! 9,604,331 !! style="text-align:center;" |Turnout !! colspan = 3|8,232,572 (85.72%)
|}

By constituency

Government formation
Congress and Praja Socialist Party alliance got the majority in the election and hence formed the government. Pattom A. Thanu Pillai of the Praja Socialist Party became the chief minister and R. Sankar of the Indian National Congress became the deputy chief minister on 22 February 1960, with eleven council ministers.

Pattam A. Thanu Pillai resigned on 26 September 1962 after he was appointed as the Governor of Punjab and R. Sankar became the first Congress Chief Minister of Kerala.

See also
 The Liberation Struggle
 President's rule
 1960 elections in India
 Pattom Thanupillai Ministry
 R. Sankar Ministry
 1957 Kerala Legislative Assembly election

References

1960
1960
Kerala